Justin Brown, also known as Justin Christopher, (born 6 December 1973) is a New Zealand best-selling author, television producer, music writer, podcast host and former radio presenter. He is best known for his works in non-fiction, humour, travel and children's fiction.

His 2013 fiction novel, Shot, Boom, Score! made it to the Storylines Children's Literature Foundation of New Zealand Notable Books List in 2014. Brown has also previously produced theatre.

As noted by New Zealand Nielsen Book Data, Kiwi Speak was a weekly bestseller in 2018.

Early life 
Justin was born in Hāwera, New Zealand. His family moved to the Kapiti Coast during his childhood years. Brown started his career delivering fridges, which led to bar work. He then volunteered at Radio Lollipop at The Starship Children’s Hospital in Auckland, New Zealand. Early author influences of his were Maurice Sendak, Tin Tin, Roald Dahl and Asterix.

Selected publications 
 2004 - UK on a G-String 
 2004 - Teed Off in the USA  (Random House New Zealand)
 2007 - The Signature Series with Joy Cowley 
 2009 - Bowling Through India  (Random House New Zealand)
 2009 - You’re a Real Kiwi When  (Hurricane Press New Zealand)
 2010 - Myth New Zealand  (Hurricane Press New Zealand)
 2013 - Shot, Boom, Score!  (Allen & Unwin)
 2018 - Kiwi Speak   (Random House New Zealand)
 2022 - Stowaway Daze (as Justin Christopher) (Browns Ink) 
 2023 - Nanas with No Manners (as Justin Christopher) (Scholastic New Zealand Ltd)

Music credits 

 2012 - Kiwiana goes pop -  Good Keen metrosexual (Universal Music) (as Justin Brown's Myth New Zealand)
 2013 - Kiwiana goes pop. Vol. 2. - A great place to bring up the kids (Frenzy Music) (as Justin Brown's Myth New Zealand)

References

External links 
 Justin Brown on Penguin Books 

Year of birth missing (living people)
Living people
New Zealand writers
21st-century New Zealand writers
People from Hāwera
1973 births